Saint Ignatius High School is a private Roman Catholic, Jesuit high school under the Diocese of Cleveland, for young men, located in the Ohio City neighborhood of Cleveland, Ohio.

History
Founded in 1886 by a German Jesuit on the invitation of Bishop Richard Gilmour, the school was originally a six-year secondary school based on the German Gymnasium that was to be attended after the completion of six years of grammar school. Separate four-year high school and college programs were formed in 1902, with the college changing its name to John Carroll University in 1923 and moving out of the Cleveland location to neighboring University Heights, Ohio in 1935.

The words and music of St. Ignatius' alma mater were composed by the school's band director, Jack T. Hearns Sr., in August 1937. His band debuted the alma mater at halftime during a football game on October 1, 1937, replacing their customary "Victory March". In 1958, St. Ignatius gave St. Xavier High School in Cincinnati permission to adapt the song.

Campus
Saint Ignatius High School remains at its original location at 1911 West 30th Street.  The campus includes the original structure, now known as the Main Building, which was completed between about 1891 and 1911   and is now a designated Cleveland Historic Landmark. On January 21, 1974, Saint Ignatius was added to the National Register of Historic Places.

Other buildings are Loyola Hall (originally St. Mary of the Assumption Elementary School), Clavius Science Center, Saint Mary of the Assumption Chapel (named after a church that once was located on the current campus), Gibbons Hall, Kesicki Hall (which now houses the Welsh Academy), The Carfagna Family Magis Athletic Center, Father Sullivan, S.J. Gymnasium, Carroll Gymnasium, Murphy Field House, Kyle Field, and the O'Donnell Athletic Complex, which houses Wasmer Field and Dale Gabor Track. In addition, the $11.5 million Breen Center for the Performing Arts replaced the Xavier Center in August 2009. It houses all student performing arts programs and hosts many events for other local arts groups. A new $3.3 million cafeteria has replaced the former Student Center, stage, senior lounge, and cooking areas. It was renamed the Rade Dining Hall. Both the St. Mary of the Assumption Chapel and the Murphy Field House projects were funded and overseen by Murlan J. Murphy.  From 1904 to 1917 St. Ignatius operated a summer retreat and science campus, in Vermilion, known as Loyola-on-the-Lake.

Academics
The school was recognized by the United States Department of Education as a "Blue Ribbon School" for the 1984-1985 and 2008-2009 school year.

Fine arts program
In 1990, a fine arts program was added to the school's curriculum. Its most recent addition has been the Breen Center for the Performing Arts. Musical opportunities include the Wildcat Marching Band, Pep Band, Stage Band, Steel Drum Band, Jazz Band, Liturgical Musicians, and others.

Clubs and activities
St. Ignatius boasts nearly 100 extra-curricular clubs and student groups, ranging from the student-led yearbook (The Ignatian) to Billiards Club. Some activities meet daily while others meet less than monthly.

The school's Latin Club functions as a local chapter of both the Ohio Junior Classical League (OJCL) and National Junior Classical League (NJCL).

Athletic program
Saint Ignatius' athletic teams are known as the Wildcats and compete as an independent in the Ohio High School Athletic Association (OHSAA), at the Division I level. Through the 2022–23 school year, the Wildcats have won 52 state championships across eleven sports teams, highlighted by their 12 state titles in soccer, including four consecutive titles from 2018-2022. Both the overall total of 12 and the four-year streak are the most in OHSAA history for soccer and the school's 52 state championships ranks third overall in boys' athletic titles.

State championships
 Football - 1988, 1989, 1991, 1992, 1993, 1994, 1995, 1999, 2001, 2008, 2011 
 Boys' Cross Country - 1993, 1994, 2009, 2015
Rugby - 2014, 2015, 2017, 2018, 2019, 2021, 2022
 Wrestling - 1988
 Ice Hockey - 2000, 2010, 2014*, 2016, 2017, 2018, 2019
 Boys' Volleyball - 2017
 Boys' Basketball – 2001
 Boys' Golf - 2001, 2002, 2021, 2022
 Boys' Track and Field - 2001, 2016
 Baseball - 2002, 2019
 Boys' Soccer - 2004, 2005, 2008, 2010, 2011, 2014, 2015, 2016, 2019, 2020, 2021, 2022
* Co-champs

The inventor of the face mask, Ralph Vince, coached the football team to its first city championship, in 1925.

Other extracurricular achievements
 Ohio High School Speech League State Champions in Policy Debate - 2001, 2004, 2006, 2012, 2013, 2014, and 2021 
 The Model United Nations team was ranked among Ohio's top 4 schools and among North America's top 150 schools during the 2013–2014 school year.

Notable alumni

See also
 List of Jesuit sites

References

External links

Saint Ignatius Official Website
St Ignatius High School yearbooks available on Cleveland Public Library Digital Gallery, various years 1940s through 2008

Boys' schools in Ohio
Education in Cleveland
Educational institutions established in 1886
High schools in Cuyahoga County, Ohio
Jesuit high schools in the United States
Catholic secondary schools in Ohio
School buildings on the National Register of Historic Places in Ohio
School buildings completed in 1891
German-American culture in Cleveland
National Register of Historic Places in Cleveland, Ohio
Ohio City, Cleveland
Roman Catholic Diocese of Cleveland
1886 establishments in Ohio